Bread Loaf Mountain may refer to:

 Bread Loaf Mountain (Connecticut) in Connecticut, USA
 Bread Loaf Mountain (Vermont) in Vermont, USA

See also
 Loaf of Bread Butte, a summit in Custer County, Montana